Terrell R. Thomas (born January 8, 1985) is a former American football cornerback. He played college football at USC.  He was drafted by the New York Giants in the second round of the 2008 NFL Draft. He is also only the second player in NFL history, after linebacker Thomas Davis, to play a down in the league after suffering from three torn ACLs in the same knee.

High school career 
Thomas prepped at Rancho Cucamonga High School.

Received a scholarship offer from Oregon State and was labeled one of the most athletic players in the state after his sophomore year.

As a junior, he racked up 78 tackles and 5 interceptions, and had 15 catches for 250 yards and 6 touchdowns.  Received All Baseline League honors for the second year in a row.

As a senior, he had 300 yards receiving to go with 5 touchdowns. He rushed for 1,300 yards and had 16 rushing touchdowns. He added 600 yards returning for a total of 2,200 yards of total offense.  On the defensive side of the ball he had 115 tackles, 7 deflections, 4 forced fumbles and one fumble recovery. He was named the league's MVP and Area Offensive Player of the year. He was selected to the 2002 Super Prep All-American team, All CIF Division II first team, Tom Lemming All-West, LA Times All-Inland Empire FIrst Team and Press Telegram's Best in the West First Team.

College career 
Thomas played college football at the University of Southern California under head coach Pete Carroll. He was named a 2007 third team preseason All-American.  He was also named to the 2007 Jim Thorpe Award Watch List.

As a senior at USC in 2007, he had 57 passes thrown his way, allowing only 29.8% of those passes to be completed.  He gave up 17 catches for 149 yards and 1 touchdown.  On average he gave up 8.76 yards per catch and gave up an outstanding 2.61 yards per pass attempt. He also had 4 interceptions and was voted to his second straight All-Pac-10 2nd Team, prior to the start of 2007 spring drills, Thomas underwent surgery to repair a left shoulder dislocation. He returned to start all 13 games and again received All-Pac-10 2nd-team recognition. Thomas ranked 9th on the squad with 45 tackles (31 solo) and had a sack with 4.5 stops for losses. He forced 3 fumbles, recovered another and batted away 7 passes, he also gained 44 yards on 4 interception returns. He was the senior member and leader of the secondary that held Brady Quinn to his lowest college completion percentage in a November 2006 game.  He was a coaches and Rivals.com second team all Pac-10 in 2006.

In 2005, Thomas took over strong side (right) cornerback for the first 2 games of the 2005 season, but he suffered torn ligaments in his right knee vs. Arkansas, underwent surgery and was lost for the rest of the year.  He finished with 5 solo tackles and a pass break-up.  Thomas reclaimed his right cornerback job in 2006, earning All-Pac-10 Conference 2nd-team honors. He ranked 7th on the team with 50 tackles (35 solo) and had 3 sacks for losses of 32 yards. He added 2 fumble recoveries, including 1 he returned for a touchdown. He also intercepted 2 passes and deflected 12 others. In 2004, Thomas played in 11 games as a reserve cornerback after moving over from free safety in spring drills, most of his playing time was in the dime packages and on special teams and he made 9 tackles (7 solo), but also batted away a pair of passes and intercepted 2 others solo tackles and a pass break-up.

Professional career

Pre-draft

New York Giants 
Thomas was drafted by the New York Giants in the second round of the 2008 NFL Draft, after projecting to be a third round pick. Thomas was the 63rd overall pick of the draft and the final pick of the second round.

2008 

Thomas missed games in his rookie season due to injuries. When he recovered from his injury he played behind Corey Webster and Aaron Ross. Thomas made the first interception of his NFL career against the Arizona Cardinals in week 12 of the 2008 NFL season, returning it 13 yards. Thomas ended his rookie season by playing in 12 games and starting 2. He mostly played in nickel packages and contributed in Special Teams. He accounted for 45 tackles, one interception, four passes defended and one force fumble.

2009 

In the 2009 season, Thomas was once again behind Webster and Ross on the depth chart. During training camp Ross was hampered by a hamstring injury. This move allowed Thomas to take snaps as the second corner. Ross inability to heal from his hamstring injury placed Thomas as the starting corner for the 2009 season. Thomas took advantage of the opportunity, before the bye Thomas had 41 tackles, 9 passes defended, 3 interceptions, 1 sack and 1 force fumble. Aaron Ross was able to come back after the bye but Thomas held on firmly to his starting spot. Ross was asked to split time as Free Safety due to lack of depth at the position. When the Giants played the Washington Redskins, Thomas contributed four tackles, two passes defended, and one interception that was returned for a touchdown in a Giants' victory of 45–12. Thomas finished the season as the number one corner because of injuries to Corey Webster and Aaron Ross being placed on injured reserve. His stats were 85 tackles, the highest on the team, five interceptions, one sack, 18 passes defended and one force fumble. He was tied for twelfth in interceptions for the league.

2011 

On August 22, 2011, in a preseason game against the Chicago Bears, Thomas tore his ACL, ending his season. He was placed on injured reserve on August 23. On March 13, 2012, Thomas re-signed with the Giants.

2012 

Thomas suffered an injury to his surgically repaired ACL early in training camp, but he expected to recover and return sometime during the 2012 season. On August 31, 2012, Thomas was placed on season-ending injured reserve.

2013 

In 2013, Thomas became the second player to come back from three torn ACLs in the same knee, joining Carolina Panthers linebacker Thomas Davis, who tore his ACL in each year from 2009 to 2011. Thomas' production was largely speculated to severely decrease after the three ACL tears, yet Thomas quickly recovered from his injuries, and totaled 67 tackles, 1 interception, and 16 games played over the course of his 2013 season.

Seattle Seahawks

2014 
On July 28, 2014, Thomas was signed by the Seattle Seahawks. Thomas was cut by the Seahawks on August 24, 2014.

Retirement 
On February 12, 2015, Thomas announced his retirement.

Statistics

References

External links 

Seattle Seahawks bio
USC Trojans football bio

1985 births
Living people
Players of American football from Pasadena, California
African-American players of American football
American football cornerbacks
American football safeties
USC Trojans football players
New York Giants players
Seattle Seahawks players
21st-century African-American sportspeople
20th-century African-American people
Ed Block Courage Award recipients